Total Control is the first solo album by John Norum, best known as the guitarist for Swedish pop-metal band Europe. It was released after Norum left Europe following the release of 1986's The Final Countdown and the tour that followed.

Track listing
All songs were written by John Norum and Marcel Jacob, except where noted.
 "Let Me Love You" – 3:23
 "Love Is Meant to Last Forever" – 3:40
 "Too Many Hearts" – 3:12
 "Someone Else Here" – 4:13 (Norum, Jacob, Peter Hermansson)
 "Eternal Flame" – 3:14
 "Back on the Streets" – 4:11 (Vinnie Vincent, Richard Friedman)
 "Blind" – 3:53
 "Law of Life" – 4:22 (Max Lorentz, Mats Lindfors)
 "We'll Do What It Takes Together" – 3:25
 "In Chase of the Wind" – 3:02
 "Wild One" (bonus track) – 4:20 (Phil Lynott)

Personnel
Credits adapted from AllMusic.
John Norum – guitars, lead and backing vocals
Marcel Jacob – bass
Göran Edman – lead vocals on "Love Is Meant to Last Forever", "Eternal Flame" and "Back on the Streets", backing vocals

Guest musicians
Per Blom – keyboards
Peter Hermansson – drums
Micke Larsson – fretless bass on "Too Many Hearts"
Mats Lindfors – backing vocals on "Law of Life"
Max Lorentz – Hammond organ on "Law of Life"
Production
John Norum – producer
Thomas Witt – producer
Per Blom – co-producer, engineer, mixing
Mats Lindfors – engineer, Mixing
Peter Dahl – mastering

Charts

Album

Singles

References

John Norum albums
1987 debut albums
CBS Records albums